Senator McCormack may refer to:

John W. McCormack (1891–1980), Massachusetts State Senate
Mike McCormack (politician) (born 1921), Washington State Senate
Peter M. McCormack (1919–1988), Massachusetts State Senate
Thomas J. McCormack (1922–1998), Pennsylvania State Senate
Tim McCormack (born 1940s), Ohio State Senate

See also
Senator McCormick (disambiguation)